Live is a live album by Swiss pianist and composer Nik Bärtsch's band Ronin recorded in Switzerland in 2002 and first released on the Tonus Music label.

Reception

The Allmusic review by Michael G. Nastos called it "compelling, commanding, well worth a close listen, and a prelude for things to be heard stateside. This may be a difficult recording to acquire, but worth the search". On All About Jazz Budd Kopman noted "When listening to Live, it becomes clear that, while the feeling of improvisation, of taking off, of winging it, is very strong, where it is happening is frustratingly unclear".

Track listing
All compositions by Nik Bärtsch.
 "Modul 14" - 13:52  
 "Modul 17" - 9:17  
 "Modul 11" - 12:15  
 "Modul 16" - 11:37  
 "Modul 8_9" - 15:50  
 "Modul 15" - 15:08

Personnel
 Nik Bärtsch – synthesizer, electric piano
 Björn Meyer – bass 
 Kaspar Rast - drums 
 Andi Pupato – percussion

References

Nik Bärtsch live albums
2003 live albums